Delaunay is a French surname. Notable people with the surname include:

People

Arts
 Catherine Delaunay (born 1969), French jazz clarinet player and composer
 Charles Delaunay (1911–1988), French author and jazz expert
 Joseph-Charles Delaunay (d. 1802), French actor, father of Marie Dorval
 Jules-Élie Delaunay (1828–1891), French painter
 Louis Arsene Delaunay (1826–1903), French actor
 Louis Delaunay (1854–1937), French actor
 Nicolas Delaunay (1739-1792), French engraver
 Robert Delaunay (1885–1941), French artist
 Rose Delaunay (born 1857), French opera ainger
 Danielle Delaunay, English/Japanese singer
 Sonia Delaunay (1885–1979), Ukrainian-French artist
 Vadim Delaunay (1947–1983), Russian poet and dissident

Football
 Henri Delaunay (1883–1955), French football administrator
 Jean-Pierre Delaunay (born 1966), French footballer
 Pierre Delaunay, football administrator

Science
 Boris Delaunay (1890–1980), Soviet/Russian mathematician, inventor of Delaunay triangulation
 Charles-Eugène Delaunay (1816–1872), French astronomer and mathematician
 Natalya Delaunay (born 1923), Soviet/Russian geneticist
 Nikolai Delaunay, Senior (1856–1931), Russian/Soviet physicist and mathematician
 Nikolai Delaunay, Junior (1926–2008), Soviet physicist

Politics
 Joseph Delaunay (1752–1794), sometimes called Delaunay d'Angers; a revolutionary-era French politician
 Michèle Delaunay (born 1947), member of the National Assembly of France

Fictional characters
Various characters in the fantasy novel Kushiel's Dart (2001):
 Alcuin nó Delaunay
 Anafiel Delaunay, spymaster and poet
 Phèdre nó Delaunay

See also
 Delaunay-Belleville, a French luxury automobile
 Delaunay (crater), a lunar crater
 Delaunay triangulation, a way to divide a plane into triangles
 Delannoy

French-language surnames